These are the official results of the women's discus throw event at the 1992 Summer Olympics in Barcelona, Spain.

Medalists

Records
These were the standing world and Olympic records (in metres) prior to the 1992 Summer Olympics.

Qualification

Final

See also
 1988 Women's Olympic Discus Throw (Seoul)
 1990 Women's European Championships Discus Throw (Split)
 1991 Women's World Championships Discus Throw (Tokyo)
 1993 Women's World Championships Discus Throw (Stuttgart)
 1994 Women's European Championships Discus Throw (Helsinki)

References

External links
 Official Report
 Results

D
Discus throw at the Olympics
1992 in women's athletics
Women's events at the 1992 Summer Olympics